The 2013–14 Louisiana–Monroe Warhawks men's basketball team represented the University of Louisiana at Monroe in the 2013–14 NCAA Division I men's basketball season. The Warhawks, led by fourth year head coach Keith Richard, played their home games at Fant–Ewing Coliseum and were members of the Sun Belt Conference. They finished the season 10–17, 7–11 in Sun Belt play to finish in seventh place. They lost in the first round of the Sun Belt tournament to Texas–Arlington.

Roster

Schedule

|-
!colspan=9 style="background:#8C1919; color:#FFCC33;"| Regular season

|-
!colspan=9 style="background:#8C1919; color:#FFCC33;"| Sun Belt Conference games

|-
!colspan=9 style="background:#8C1919; color:#FFCC33;"| Sun Belt tournament

References

Louisiana–Monroe Warhawks men's basketball seasons
Louisiana-Monroe